David Paulmin (born January 24, 1996) is a Canadian soccer goalkeeper who plays for Norwegian club Stjørdals-Blink.

Club career

FC Montreal
After spending four years with the Montreal Impact Academy, Paulmin joined USL club FC Montreal for their inaugural season.  He made his professional debut on April 11, 2015 in a 3–0 defeat to the Rochester Rhinos. FC Montreal would cease operations after the 2016 USL season.

Ottawa Fury
After 2 years with FC Montreal, Paulmin signed with Ottawa Fury of the USL prior to the 2017 season. After failing to make an appearance in the 2017 season, Paulmin was released.

Kvik Halden
On 1 April 2018, Paulmin signed with Norwegian 3. divisjon club Kvik Halden FK and appeared in the team's final pre-season friendly the following day against KFUM Oslo, a 3–3 draw. He made his competitive debut for the club on 18 April in the first round of the 2018 Norwegian Football Cup, a 4–0 loss to 2. divisjon club Fredrikstad. Paulmin would help Kvik Halden achieve promotion to the 2. divisjon in 2018, starting 22 league games during the season. In 2019, Paulmin would start 28 league games, as Kvik Halden would lose out on a second consecutive promotion to the 1. divisjon to Åsane.

Egersunds IK

After three seasons with Kvik Halden, Paulmin would move to fellow 2. Divisjon club Egersunds, signing a two year contract for the 2021 and 2022 seasons.

Stjørdals-Blink
In September 2021, Paulmin would sign with OBOS-ligaen club Stjørdals-Blink for the remainder of the 2021 season.

Career statistics

Club

International career
Paulmin holds both Canadian and French citizenship.

References

External links
USSF Development Academy bio

1996 births
Living people
Canadian soccer players
Association football goalkeepers
Canadian expatriate soccer players
Expatriate footballers in Norway
People from Sainte-Thérèse, Quebec
Soccer people from Quebec
Montreal Impact U23 players
FC Montreal players
Ottawa Fury FC players
Kvik Halden FK players
USL Championship players
Canadian Soccer League (1998–present) players
Canadian expatriate sportspeople in Norway
Egersunds IK players
Norwegian Third Division players
Norwegian Second Division players